Marcel Jones (born September 4, 1988) is a former American football offensive tackle. He was selected in the seventh round, 234th overall, by the Saints in the 2012 NFL Draft and On July 2, 2012, Jones signed a four-year deal with the Saints. He played college football at Nebraska.

Jones attended Trevor G. Browne High School in Phoenix, Arizona, where he played basketball, track (threw shot put & discus) coached by Head Throws Coach Scott Miller, and was an academic standout.  Due to injuries, he played only one year of varsity high school football. He now works full time at Kiewit Corporation.

Professional career

New Orleans Saints
Jones was drafted in the seventh round of the 2012 NFL Draft by the New Orleans Saints. On September 8, 2012, he was placed on season-ending injured reserve due to a knee injury. Jones spent the 2013 season on the Saints' practice squad. On January 14, 2014, he signed a reserve/future contract with the Saints. On August 30, 2014, he was cut by the Saints.

Baltimore Ravens
On September 1, 2014, the Baltimore Ravens signed Jones to their practice squad. On January 12, 2015, he signed a reserve/future contract with the Ravens. On August 31, 2015, Jones was cut by the Ravens but was brought back shortly to the practice squad. On November 20, 2015, he was released. On November 27, 2015, he was re-signed to the practice squad. On December 4, 2015, the Baltimore Ravens released Jones from the practice squad. On December 15, 2015, he was re-signed to the practice squad.

San Diego Chargers
Jones was signed by the San Diego Chargers on July 29, 2016. On September 3, 2016, he was released by the Chargers.

References

External links
 New Orleans Saints profile
 Nebraska profile

1988 births
Living people
American football offensive tackles
Nebraska Cornhuskers football players
New Orleans Saints players
Baltimore Ravens players
San Diego Chargers players
Players of American football from Phoenix, Arizona